Breekout Krew was an American male vocal duo, which had a single called "Matt's Mood", in the UK Singles Chart. It was released on the London Records label, entered the chart on 24 November 1984, and rose to a high of number 51; it remained in the charts for three weeks.

References

American musical duos
Musical groups established in 1984